Tallberg or Tällberg is a surname of Scandinavian origin. It may refer to:

Bertil Tallberg (1883–1963), Finnish sailor 
Georg Tallberg (born 1961), Finnish sailor
Gunnar Tallberg (1881–1931), Finnish sailor
Henrik Tallberg (born 1942), Finnish sailor 
Johan Tallberg (born 1948), Finnish sailor
Julius Tallberg (1857–1921), Finnish businessman
Per-Inge Tällberg (born 1967), Swedish ski jumper
Peter Tallberg (1937–2015), Finnish sailor 
Staffan Tällberg (born 1970), Swedish ski jumper
Teemu Tallberg (born 1991), Finnish ice hockey player

See also
Tällberg, a village in Sweden
Thalberg

Finland Swedish surnames